Raja bin Ngah Ali (born 1933) is a Malaysian sprinter. He competed in the men's 100 metres at the 1956 Summer Olympics.

References

External links
 

1933 births
Living people
People from Perak
Athletes (track and field) at the 1956 Summer Olympics
Malaysian male sprinters
Olympic athletes of Malaya
Place of birth missing (living people)